Deuterocopus bathychasma is a moth of the family Pterophoridae described by Thomas Bainbrigge Fletcher in 1910. It can be found on Sumbawa in Indonesia.

References

Moths described in 1910
Deuterocopinae